Robert James  Allen (born July 17, 1946) is an American basketball player during the 1960s.

Allen played collegiately for Marshall University.  He was selected by the San Francisco Warriors in the sixth round (71st pick overall) of the 1968 NBA draft.  He played in 27 games in the National Basketball Association (NBA) for the Warriors (1968–69 season).

References 

1946 births
Living people
American men's basketball players
Marshall Thundering Herd men's basketball players
Power forwards (basketball)
San Francisco Warriors draft picks
San Francisco Warriors players